Bobby Murray may refer to:

 Bobby Murray (baseball) (1898–1979), baseball player
 Bobby Murray (musician) (born 1953), American electric blues guitarist, songwriter and record producer